Sambhaji Shivaji Bhosale (14 May 1657 – 11 March 1689) was the second Chhatrapati of the Maratha Empire, ruling from 1681 to 1689. He was the eldest son of Shivaji, the founder of the Maratha Empire. Sambhaji's rule was largely shaped by the ongoing wars between the Maratha Empire and the Mughal Empire, as well as other neighbouring powers such as the Abyssinians of Janjira, Wadiyars of Mysore and the Portuguese Empire in Goa. After Sambhaji's death, his brother Rajaram I succeeded him as the next Chhatrapati and continue the Mughal–Maratha Wars.

Early life 
Sambhaji was born at Purandar fort to the Maratha Emperor Shivaji, and his first wife Saibai, who died when he was two years old and he was raised by his paternal grandmother Jijabai. At the age of nine, Sambhaji was sent to live with Raja Jai Singh I of Amber as a political hostage to ensure compliance of the Treaty of Purandar that Shivaji had signed with the Mughals on 11 June 1665. As a result of the treaty, Sambhaji became a Mughal mansabdar. He and his father Shivaji attended the Mughal emperor Aurangzeb's court at Agra on 12 May 1666. Aurangzeb put both of them under house arrest but they escaped on 22 July 1666. However, the two sides reconciled and had cordial relations during the period 1666–1670. During the period between 1666 and 1668, Aurangzeb initially refused but later officially recognized the title of Raja on behalf of Mughal Empire over Shivaji after being pressed by Prince Mu'azzam. Aurangzeb looked upon the friendship of Prince Muazzam and Shivaji and Sambhaji with great suspicion. By mediation of Muazzam, Sambhaji was also restored to the Mughal mansabdar rank of 5,000 cavalry. Shivaji then sent Sambhaji with general Prataprao Gujar to take service under Prince Mu'azzam who was the Mughal viceroy at Aurangabad with Diler Khan as his deputy. Sambhaji visited prince Muazzam at Aurangabad on 4th November 1667 and was then granted rights to territory in Berar in pretext of revenue collection. After a short stay Sambhaji returned to Rajgad while representative Maratha officers continued to stay in Aurangabad. In this period, the Marathas under Sambhaji fought alongside the Mughals under Muazzam against the Sultanate of Bijapur.

Marriage 
Sambhaji was married to Jivubai in a marriage of political alliance; per Maratha custom she took the name Yesubai. Jivubai was the daughter of Pilaji Shirke, who had entered Shivaji's service following the defeat of Deshmukh Suryaji Surve who was his previous liege. This marriage thus gave Shivaji the access of the region of Konkan coastal belt. Yesubai had two children, daughter Bhavani Bai and then a son named Shivaji, who later became the Chhatrapati of the Maratha empire.

Arrest and defection to the Mughals 
Sambhaji's behaviour, including alleged irresponsibility and addiction to sensual pleasures, led Shivaji to imprison his son at Panhala fort in 1678 to curb his behaviour. Sambhaji escaped from the fort with his wife and rejoined Diler Khan in December 1678 for a year, but then returned home when he learnt of a plan by Diler Khan, the Mughal viceroy of Deccan, to arrest him and send him to Delhi. Upon returning home, Sambhaji was put under surveillance at Panhala.

Accession 
When Shivaji died in the first week of April 1680, Sambhaji was still held captive at Panhala fort. At that time, Soyrabai, Shivaji's ambitious widow and Sambhaji's step-mother, along with influential courtiers such as Annaji Datto and other ministers conspired against Sambhaji, to prevent him from succeeding the throne. In a rush, they installed Soyrabai's son, and Sambhaji's half-brother, Rajaram, then aged ten, on the throne on 21 April 1680. Upon hearing this news, Sambhaji plotted his escape and took possession of the Panhala fort on 27 April after killing the fort commander. On 18 June, he acquired control of Raigad Fort. Sambhaji formally ascended the throne on 20 July 1680. Rajaram, his wife Janki Bai and mother Soyarabai were imprisoned. Soon after when there was another conspiracy attempt against Sambhaji using prince Akbar, Aurangzeb's fourth son, some of Soyarabai's kinsmen from the Shirke clan and some of Shivaji's ministers such as Annaji Datto were executed on charges of conspiracy.<ref name="SharmaLāʼibrerī2004"> – By June 1680 three months after Shivaji's death Rajaram was made a prisoner in the fort of Raigad."</ref>

 Military expeditions and conflicts 
Shortly following Sambhaji's accession, he began his military campaigns against neighboring states. 

 Attack on Burhanpur 

Bahadur Khan was first in charge of The fort of Burhanpur who later gave it to Kakar Khan. Kakar was at the duty of collecting jizya tax from the Hindu citizens of Burhanpur. The Jizya was collected and stored captive at the Burhanpur fort. Sambhaji plundered and ravaged Burhanpur in 1680. His forces completely routed the Mughal garrison and punitively executed captives. The Marathas then looted the city and set its ports ablaze. Sambhaji then withdrew into Baglana, evading the forces of Mughal commander Khan Jahan Bahadur.

 Mughal Empire 
In 1681, Aurangzeb's fourth son Akbar left the Mughal court along with a few Muslim Mansabdar supporters and joined Muslim rebels in the Deccan. Aurangzeb in response moved his court south to Aurangabad and took over command of the Deccan campaign. The rebels were defeated and Akbar fled south to seek refuge with Sambhaji. Sambhaji's ministers including Annaji Datto, and other ministers took this opportunity and conspired again to enthrone Rajaram again. They signed a treasonable letter against Sambhaji in which they promised to join Akbar, to whom the letter was sent. Akbar gave this letter to Sambhaji. Enraged, Sambhaji executed conspirators on charges of treason.

For five years, Akbar stayed with Sambhaji, hoping that the latter would lend him men and money to strike and seize the Mughal throne for himself. Unfortunately for Sambhaji, giving asylum to Akbar did not bear fruit. Eventually, Sambhaji helped Akbar flee to Persia. On the other hand, Aurangzeb after coming to Deccan never returned to his capital in the north.
 Siege of Ramsej (1682) 

In 1682, the Mughals laid siege to the Maratha fort of Ramsej, but after five months of failed attempts, including planting explosive mines and building wooden towers to gain the walls, the Mughal siege failed.

Aurangzeb tried attacking the Maratha Empire from all directions. He intended to use the Mughal numerical superiority to his advantage. Sambhaji had prepared well for the invasions and the Maratha forces promptly engaged the numerically strong Mughal army in several small battles using guerilla warfare tactics. However, Sambhaji and his generals attacked and Defeated the Mughal generals whenever they got an opportunity to lure the Mughal generals into decisive battles in the Maratha stronghold territories. Sambhaji had devised a strategy of minimising the losses on his side. If there used to be an opportunity then the Maratha army attacked decisively, however, if the Mughals were too strong in numbers then the Marathas used to retreat. This proved to be a very effective strategy as Aurangzeb's generals were not able capture the Maratha territories for a period of three years.

 Mughal invasions of Konkan (1684) 

Aurangzeb then decided to attack the Maratha capital Raigad Fort directly from the North and the South directions. He made a pincer attempt to surround the Maratha Capital that led to Mughal invasions of Konkan (1684). The Mughals were badly defeated due to the Maratha strategy and the harsh climate of the region. These failures forced Aurangzeb to look away from the Maratha Empire and search for success against the Qutb Shahi dynasty and Adil Shahi dynasty. Under Sambhaji (1680–89) the Marathas ranged up and down western India.

 Siddis of Janjira 

The Marathas under Shivaji came into conflict with the Siddis, Muslims of Abyssinian descent settled in India, over the control of the Konkan coast. Shivaji was able to reduce their presence to the fortified island of Janjira. Sambhaji continued the Maratha campaign against them, while at that time the Siddis formed an alliance with the Mughals. At the start of 1682, a Maratha army later joined by Sambhaji personally, attacked the island for thirty days, doing heavy damage but failing to breach its defenses. Sambhaji then attempted a ruse, sending a party of his people to the Siddis, claiming to be defectors. They were allowed into the fort and planned to detonate the gunpowder magazine during a coming Maratha attack. However, one of the female defectors became involved with a Siddi man and he uncovered the plot, and the infiltrators were executed. The Maratha then attempted to build a stone causeway from the shore to the island, but were interrupted halfway through when the Mughal army moved to menace Raigad. Sambhaji returned to counter them and his remaining troops were unable to overcome the Janjira garrison and the Siddi fleet protecting it.

 Portuguese and English 

Having failed to take Janjira in 1682, Sambhaji sent a commander to seize the Portuguese coastal fort of Anjadiva instead. The Marathas seized the fort, seeking to turn it into a naval base, but in April 1682 were ejected from the fort by a detachment of 200 Portuguese. This incident led to a larger conflict between the two regional powers.

The Portuguese colony of Goa at that time provided supplies to the Mughals, allowed them to use the Portuguese ports in India and pass through their territory. In order to deny this support to the Mughals, Sambhaji undertook a campaign against Portuguese Goa in late 1683, storming the colony and taking its forts. The situation for the colonists became so dire that the Portuguese viceroy, Francisco de Távora, conde de Alvor went with his remaining supporters to the cathedral where the crypt of Saint Francis Xavier was kept, where they prayed for deliverance. The viceroy had the casket opened and gave the saint's body his baton, royal credentials and a letter asking the saint's support. Sambhaji's Goa campaign was checked by the arrival of the Mughal army and navy in January 1684, forcing him to withdraw.

Meanwhile, in 1684 Sambhaji signed a defensive treaty with the English at Bombay, realising his need for English arms and gunpowder, particularly as their lack of artillery and explosives impeded the Maratha's ability to lay siege to fortifications. Thus reinforced, Sambhaji proceeded to take Pratapgad and a series of forts along the Ghats.

 Mysore 

Much like his father Shivaji's Karnataka campaign, Sambhaji attempted in 1681 to invade Mysore, then a southern principality ruled by Wodeyar Chikkadevaraja. Sambhaji's large army was repelled, as had happened to Shivaji in 1675. The Chikkadevraja later made treaties and rendered tribute to the Maratha kingdom during the conflicts of 1682–1686. The Chikkadevraja however began to draw close to the Mughal empire and ceased to follow his treaties with the Marathas. In response, Sambhaji invaded Mysore in 1686, accompanied by his Brahmin friend and poet Kavi Kalash.

 Capture and execution 

In 1687 Battle of Wai,The key Maratha commander Hambirao Mohite was killed and troops began to desert the Maratha armies. Sambhaji's positions were spied upon by his own relations, the Shirke family, who had defected to the Mughals. Ganoji Shirke(Brother in law of Sambhaji) informed his location to Muqarrab Khan a Mughal commander.Sambhaji and 25 of his advisors were captured by the Mughal forces of Muqarrab Khan in a skirmish at Sangameshwar in February 1689.

Accounts of Sambhaji's confrontation with the Mughal ruler and following torture, execution and disposal of his body, vary widely depending on the source, though generally all agree that he was tortured and executed on the emperor's orders.

The captured Sambhaji and Kavi Kalash were taken to Bahadurgad in present-day Ahmednagar district, where Aurangzeb humiliated them by parading them wearing clown's clothes and they were subjected to insults by Mughal soldiers. 

Accounts vary as to the reasons for what came next: Mughal accounts state that Sambhaji was asked to surrender his forts, treasures and names of Mughal collaborators with the Marathas and that he sealed his fate by insulting both the emperor and the Islamic prophet Muhammad during interrogation and was executed for having killed Muslims. The ulema of the Mughal Empire sentenced Sambhaji to death on allegations of the atrocities his troops perpetrated against Muslims in Burhanpur, including plunder, killing, dishonour, and torture.

Maratha accounts instead state that he was ordered to bow before Aurangzeb and convert to Islam and it was his refusal to do so, by saying that he would accept Islam on the day the Aurangzeb presented him his daughter's hand, that led to his death. By doing so he earned the title of Dharmaveer ("protector of dharma"). Aurangzeb ordered the execution of Sambhaji and Kavi Kalash; the process took over a fortnight and included plucking out their eyes and tongue, pulling out their nails and removing their skin. Sambhaji was finally executed on 11 March 1689, reportedly by tearing him apart from the front and back with wagh nakhe (metal "tiger claws") and beheading with an axe at Tulapur on the banks of the Bhima river near Pune.

Other accounts state that Sambhaji challenged Aurangzeb in open court and refused to convert to Islam. Dennis Kincaid writes, "He (Sambhaji) was ordered by the Emperor to embrace Islam. He refused and was made to run the gauntlet of the whole Imperial army. Tattered and bleeding he was brought before the Emperor and repeated his refusal. His tongue was torn and again the question was put. He called for writing material and wrote 'Not even if the emperor bribed me with his daughter!' So then he was put to death by torture".

Some accounts state that Sambhaji's body was cut into pieces and thrown into the river or that the body or portions were recaptured and cremated at the confluence of rivers at Tulapur. – When they were finally thrown away, the Marathas brought Sambhaji's head to Tulapur and consigned if to fire at the confluence of the Bheema and Indrayani rivers. Other accounts state that Sambhaji's remains were fed to the dogs.

 Governance 
Sambhaji inherited the governance system created by Shivaji. He continued with most of his father's policies. The administration of the state was managed by Sambhaji with the help of Chandogamatya and the council of eight ministers. According to P. S. Joshi Sambhaji was a good administrator who gave impartial justice to his subjects.

 Measures against drought 
Maharashtra witnessed severe drought during the reign of Sambhaji (1684–88). Sambhaji had to take several administrative measures to tackle the situation. Sambhaji continued Shivaji's policies by helping poor farmers. Shankar Narayan Joshi has stated that his approach against famine was very constructive and he provided solutions to many complicated problems. His policies of water storage, irrigation and developing crop patterns show about his progressive policies.

Sambhaji provided grain seeds, exemptions in taxes, oxen for agricultural work and agricultural tools to the farmers in the drought situation. All these measures were implemented sincerely during the drought period.

 Encouragement to agricultural activities 

Sambhaji encouraged the agricultural activity in the Maratha state. Agriculture was the backbone of the rural Maratha economy. He encouraged people to cultivate more and more land. The government of Sambhaji gave promises of safety to the Marathas who gained independence from the Mughals and asked them to carry out their previous work of cultivation in their territories. It also called back the people who had absconded because of their inability to pay taxes and asked them carry out their previous work of cultivation.

Sambhaji in his letter of 3 June 1684 addressed to Hari Shivdev (Subhedar and Karkun of Tarf Chaul), his Peshwa Nilkantha Moreshwar directed him to bring the agricultural land of the villages confiscated by the government under cultivation which otherwise would have remained uncultivated. He also asked Hari Shivdev to distribute fifty khandis of grain which were being sent to him from Sagargad among the cultivators.

Sambhaji tried to increase the income (revenue) from the agricultural activities. He also made efforts to cultivate more wasted or barren lands.

 Religious policy 
P. S. Joshi states that Sambhaji, his ministers and officers took interest in supporting the cultural and religious activity in the state. They honoured and encouraged learning by granting land, grains and money to scholars.

 Innovations 
Sambhaji is used many innovations during his campaigns, one such innovation was when he made jackets from leather for his soldiers to ensure protection from lethal arrows fired by the Mysore army during his campaign against Mysore, it was highly successful as after the initial defeat of the Maratha army due to the poisonous arrows, the Maratha army was able to negate the arrows and achieved victory by using these leather jackets.

 Literary contributions 
Sambhaji was sophisticated, educated and well-versed in a few languages besides Marathi. Keshav Pandit was employed for Sambhaji's education. Keshav Pandit, alias Keshav Bhatta of Shringarpur, was an erudite scholar in the Nitishastra and Sanskrit language and literature. He seems to have deeper knowledge of the different forms of Sanskrit literature; Hindu jurisprudence and the Puranas. He also seems to have made Sambhaji familiar with the famous works of different sciences and music written by ancient scholars in the Sanskrit language. Keshav Pandit composed Dandaniti on Maratha jurisprudence and also composed the Sanskrit biography of Sambhaji's brother titled 'Shri Rajaramacharitra' detailing his early campaigns and escape to Jinji.

Sambhaji composed several books during his lifetime. The most notable is Budhbhushanam written in Marathi and Sanskrit, and three other books, Nayikabhed, Saatsatak, Nakhshikha are in Hindustani language. In Budhbhushanam, Sambhaji wrote poetry on politics. In the book Sambhaji writes about dos and don'ts for a king and discusses military tactics. The first few shlokas are praises for Shahaji (his grandfather) and his father Shivaji. In Budhbhushan Sambhaji considers Shahji to be the incarnation of Indra and Shivaji to be the incarnation of Vishnu that saved the earth and restored righteousness. Kavindra Paramanand Govind Newaskar of Poladpur composed Anupurana, a partially-completed Sanskrit biography on the life of Chhatrapati Sambhaji upto the birth of Shahu I as a sequel to his father's Sanskrit biography Shivabharata. Hari Kavi, also known as Bhanubhatta composed Haihayendra Charitra as well as its commentary Shambu Vilasika on orders of Sambhaji. Hari Kavi also authored Subhashitaharavalli and composed the Sanskrit biography 'Shambhuraja Charitra' on Sambhaji's life and romance in 1684.

 Succession 
The Maratha Kingdom was put into disarray by Sambhaji's death and his younger half-brother Rajaram I assumed the throne. Rajaram shifted the Maratha capital far south to Jinji, while Maratha guerrilla fighters under Santaji Ghorpade and Dhanaji Jadhav continued to harass the Mughal army. A few days after Sambhaji's death, the capital Raigad Fort fell to the Mughals. Sambhaji's widow, Yesubai, son, Shahu and Shivaji's widow, Sakvarbai were captured; Sakvarbai died in Mughal captivity. Shahu, who was seven years of age when captured, remained prisoner of the Mughals for 18 years from February 1689 until Mughal Emperor Aurangzeb's death in 1707. Shahu was then set free by Emperor Muhammad Azam Shah, son of Aurangzeb. After his release Shahu had to fight a brief succession war with his aunt Tarabai, Rajaram's widow who claimed the throne for her own son, Shivaji II. The Mughals kept Yesubai captive to ensure that Shahu adhered to the terms of his release. She was released in 1719 when Marathas became strong enough under Shahu and Peshwa Balaji Vishwanath.

 In popular culture 
Films and television shows based on Sambhaji's life have been produced in India.
These include:
 Chhatrapati Sambhaji (1925) by Narayanrao D. Sarpotdar
 Chhatrapati Sambhaji'' (1934) by Parshwanath Yeshwant Altekar
 Swarajya Rakshak Sambhaji – TV Series (2017–2020).

Books 
Chhatrapati Sambhaji Maharaj (Vasudeo Sitaram Bendrey) 
Sambhajiraja Jwalajwalantejas (Dr. Sadashiv Shivade)
Sambhaji Maharajanchi Patre (Dr. Sadashiv Shivade)
Chhatrapati Sambhaji Maharajanchi Rajneeti (Dr. Kedar Phalke)
Maharadnyi Yesubai (Dr. Sadashiv Shivade)
Senapati Hambirrao Mohite (Dr. Sadashiv Shivade)
Chhatrapati Sambhaji ek Chikitsa (Dr. Jaisingrao Pawar)
Chhatrapati Sambhaji Maharaj Sanskrut Sahitya (R.A. Kadam)
Paramanandkavyam (S.M.Ayachit, Dr. Sadashiv Shivade)
Swarajya Rakshanacha Ladha (Mohan Shete, Pandurang Balakawade, Sudhir Thorat)
ShambhuPratap DinVishesh (Uday A. Sankhe)
Sambhajikalin Patrasarsangraha (S. N. Joshi)

See also 
 Bhosale family ancestry
 Maratha clan system
 Marathi people

References

External links 
 

1657 births
1689 deaths
17th-century Indian monarchs
Executed Indian people
Hindu martyrs
Hindu monarchs
People executed by India by decapitation
People executed by the Mughal Empire
People from Maharashtra
Warriors of the Maratha Empire
People executed for refusing to convert to Islam
Executed monarchs